Koolma may refer to several places in Estonia:

Koolma, Ida-Viru County, village in Maidla Parish, Ida-Viru County
Koolma, Põlva County, village in Veriora Parish, Põlva County